Villavicencio is a city and municipality in Colombia.

Villavicencio may also refer to:

Centauros Villavicencio, Colombian football club
Villavicencio de los Caballeros, municipality in Castile and León, Spain
Hotel Villavicencio, hotel in Argentina

People
Antonio Villavicencio (1775–1816), Colombian governor
Arturo Villavicencio, Ecuadorian scientist
Diana Villavicencio (born 1985), Ecuadorian judoka
Jorge Villavicencio (1958–2020), Guatemalan politician and physician
Matías Villavicencio (born 1981), Argentine footballer
Manuel Villavicencio (1834–1925), Peruvian naval officer
Pedro Malo de Villavicencio, Spanish viceroy
Pedro Nuñez de Villavicencio (1635–1700), Spanish Baroque painter
Teófilo Villavicencio Marxuach (1912–1992), Puerto Rican journalist and politician
Virgil Villavicencio, Filipino basketball player and coach

Spanish-language surnames